Siva Simha Malla, also known as Shiva Simha or Shivasimha, was a Malla ruler and the sixth king of Kantipur. He started his reign on 1578 after deposing his brother Sadashiva Malla.

Life 
His brother, Sadashiva Malla, was a decadent King and was deposed by Shivasimha Malla and the general public in 1578. He was crowned as the King of Kantipur following the forced exile of his brother to Bhadgaon.

Shivasimha Malla was of simple nature, but an ambitious king. He annexed Patan in around 1600 which was then ruled by the descendents of Vishnusimha since the time of disintegration after Yakshya Malla. He then conquered Dolakha and brought it under the control of Kantipur.

He first installed his son Harihara Simha as the governor of Patan. Harihara Simha died shortly afterwards, and his eldest son Siddhi Narasimha Malla was the governor of Patan.

Succession 
After the death of Shivasimha in 1619, Lakshmi Narasimha Malla, another son of Harihara Simha, succeeded him as the King of Kantipur, and Siddhi Narasimha Malla declared Patan independent from Kantipur. Thus, the kingdoms of Kantipur and Patan united by Shivasimha were divided again by his grandsons.

References 

Malla rulers of Kantipur
Malla rulers of Lalitpur
1619 deaths
Year of birth unknown
17th-century Nepalese people
16th-century Nepalese people
Nepalese monarchs